A hatstand (UK), hatrack (US), coat rack, coat stand, hall tree, or portmanteau is a device used to store hats and often coats on, and umbrellas within. A coat rack often refers to a set of hooks that are attached to a wall. A hatrack was used to decorate Victorian front halls while providing storage.

Description 

A hatstand is a device used to store hats and often coats on, and umbrellas within. The complicated shapes of the spindles and hooks of both varieties create an interesting pattern on the wall.

Name 
The device is known by various names including hatstand (UK), hatrack (US), coat rack, coat stand, and hall tree. A coat rack often refers to a set of hooks that are attached to a wall and is mainly used to hang coats and jackets; the self-standing variant is more often referred to as a hatstand, and is mostly used to hang coats, jackets, umbrellas and hats.

History
The front hall was the introduction to the house, and as such was an important part of the Victorian home. Furnishings were selected not only to make it a useful place to hang a hat and coat, store an umbrella and leave a calling card, but also to show family wealth, social position and knowledge of current styles. A hall stand or a hatrack was the most important piece of furniture. These were new forms that appeared about 1840, such as the hall tree, as homes became larger and social visits became more structured. Smaller houses had smaller front halls, so a hanging hatrack was the answer to the problem of storing visitors' coats and hats. As well as holding hats and coats, a hall tree could be used to store bags, umbrellas, walking sticks, boots and other items.

By the 1920s, houses had become smaller, and hall furnishings were usually just a chair, a table and perhaps a mirror; a closet or cupboard held hats and coats.

See also
 Clothes valet
 Entryway

References

External links

Furniture
Hats